"Guess I'm Dumb" is a song recorded by American singer Glen Campbell that was released as his seventh single on Capitol Records on June 7, 1965. Written by Brian Wilson and Russ Titelman, it is a love song that describes a man who regrets ending a relationship after he realizes he still harbors deep feelings for his former lover. The single failed to chart.

The song was originally intended to be recorded by Wilson's band, the Beach Boys, during the sessions for their album The Beach Boys Today! Wilson's bandmates rejected the track, and so he ultimately produced it for Campbell, who had recently been hired as an emergency fill-in for Wilson on the group's concert tours. The song has since been covered by artists including Tatsuro Yamashita, Louis Phillipe, and Wondermints.

Background and recording

"Guess I'm Dumb" is a love song that describes a man who regrets ending a relationship after he realizes he still harbors deep feelings for his former lover.  It was one of two songs written by Brian Wilson and Russ Titelman during the early 1960s, the other being "Sherry She Needs Me". Titelman recalled co-writing the song in 1964 at Wilson's apartment and his wife Marilyn's home.

Wilson produced the backing track on October 14, 1964, at Western Studio in Hollywood during the early sessions for The Beach Boys Today! His 2016 memoir states: "When I was finished, no one from the band wanted to sing it. The message was okay, but maybe it was just the idea of being dumb." Campbell, then a studio musician who had played on many of the band's recordings, said, "I played on the track for Brian and the Beach Boys, and the guys didn't want to do it. ... that's when Mike Love thought he was the star of the show. If he hadn't had Brian Wilson to write, I don't think anything would have happened."

From December 1964 to early 1965, Campbell filled in for Wilson on the band's concert tours after Wilson had suffered a nervous breakdown. As a show of thanks, Wilson gave the song to Campbell. According to Campbell, "Brian [said], 'Glen you want to sing it?' I said, 'Sure I do.' Because I kind of liked it. It was a great track and the guys already had some background on it." Campbell's lead vocal was recorded on March 8, 1965.

Wilson's working title for the Beach Boys' unfinished album Smile was Dumb Angel. According to biographer John Tobler, "whether or not there is any significance and connection in the [similar title of 'Guess I'm Dumb'] is open to question."

Composition
Musicologist Philip Lambert wrote about "Guess I'm Dumb" in his 2007 book Inside the Music of Brian Wilson:

Reception
"Guess I'm Dumb"  was released as Campbell's seventh single on Capitol Records on June 7, 1965. It failed to chart.

Biographer David Leaf referred to the song as "Brian's most ambitious outside production effort, and one of the first records that consolidated all his ideas into a coherent sound. The instrumental sophistication, the intricate voices, the forlorn lyrics—this song and production were an obvious foreshadowing of Pet Sounds." Writing in his book Sonic Alchemy, David Howard said "Guess I'm Dumb" was Wilson's "most inspired" production to date, featuring a "surging, elegant Burt Bacharach-inspired string and horn arrangement and Campbell's forlorn Roy Orbison-like vocal." Journalist Domenic Priore credited the arrangement with influencing subsequent work by Jimmy Webb.

Marilyn Wilson and Ginger Blake reflected on the song's relative commercial failure, "It's a shame that Capitol Records did not carry out the promotion of one of the finest performances by Glen Campbell and the beautiful songwriting from Brian Wilson. Brian loved the song as did we. It's a mystery as to why it was not a hit."

Variations
The song is featured on many Glen Campbell compilations, and appears as one of the many Wilson-produced tracks on Pet Projects: The Brian Wilson Productions (2003). In 2013, the instrumental track with backing vocals was released on the Beach Boys compilation Made in California.

Personnel

Per Beach Boys archivist Craig Slowinski.
Glen Campbell – lead vocals, twelve-string acoustic guitar

The Beach Boys
Brian Wilson – backing vocals, acoustic grand piano
Carl Wilson – backing vocals, twelve-string electric guitar

The Honeys
 Marilyn Wilson – backing vocals
Diane Rovell – backing vocals
 Ginger Blake – backing vocals

Session musicians (later known as "the Wrecking Crew")

Hal Blaine – drums, timbales, bell tree
Roy Caton – trumpet
Harry Betts – trombone
Louis Blackburn – trombone
Steve Douglas – tenor saxophone
Larry Knechtel – electric bass guitar
Jay Migliori – baritone saxophone
Oliver Mitchell – trumpet
Tommy Tedesco – guitar

The Sid Sharp Strings

Arnold Belnick – violins
Jesse Ehrlich – cello
Jim Getzoff – violin
Anne Goodman – cello
Leonard Malarski – violin
Alexander Neiman – viola
Sidney Sharp – violin
Darrel Terwilliger – viola

Production
Chuck Britz – engineer

Cover versions
 1966 – Dani Sheridan
 1967 – Johnny Wells
 1983 – Tatsuro Yamashita, Melodies (later featured in 1984's Big Wave)
 1988 – Louis Phillipe, Ivory Tower
 1996 – Wondermints, Wonderful World of the Wondermints
 2004 – Jules Shear, Sayin' Hello to the Folks

See also 
 "Had to Phone Ya" – a song by Wilson in which he recycled part of the melody of "Guess I'm Dumb"

References

Bibliography

External links
 

1965 singles
Glen Campbell songs
The Beach Boys songs
Songs written by Brian Wilson
Song recordings produced by Brian Wilson
Capitol Records singles
1965 songs
Songs written by Russ Titelman